The Dirty Outlaws, also known as Big Ripoff, King of the West and The Desperado (in original Italian, El desperado), is a 1967 Italian Spaghetti Western starring Andrea Giordana.

Quentin Tarantino ranked the film 13th in his personal "Top 20 favorite Spaghetti Westerns".

Plot
An outlaw masquerades as a blind man's son in order to trick him into a cache of gold. After a while he grows attached to the family and all goes well until the outlaws gang comes through town...

Cast
 Andrea Giordana: Steve Belasco
 Rosemary Dexter: Katie
 Franco Giornelli: Asher
 Dana Ghia: Lucy

Releases
Wild East released the film on an out-of-print limited edition Region 0 NTSC DVD in 2006.

References

External links
 

1967 films
1960s Italian-language films
Spaghetti Western films
1967 Western (genre) films
Films scored by Gianni Ferrio
1967 directorial debut films
1960s Italian films